James Ernest Cooper (born 19 January 1942) is an English footballer who played as a winger in the Football League for Chester, Southport, Blackpool, Mansfield Town and Crewe Alexandra.

References

1942 births
Living people
Sportspeople from Chester
Association football wingers
English footballers
Chester City F.C. players
Southport F.C. players
Blackpool F.C. players
Mansfield Town F.C. players
Crewe Alexandra F.C. players
English Football League players